Bertram Raphael (born 1936) is an American computer scientist known for his contributions to artificial intelligence.

Early life and education
Raphael was born in 1936 in New York. He received his bachelor's degree in physics from the Rensselaer Polytechnic Institute in 1957, and an MS degree in Applied Math from Brown University in 1959. He was a student of Marvin Minsky at the Massachusetts Institute of Technology and received his PhD in mathematics in 1964.

Career
Raphael started at SRI International in 1964 as a consultant. After completing his Ph.D. at MIT, he was at the University of California, Berkeley for an academic year, and subsequently joined SRI full-time in April 1965. He was a long-time member of SRI's Artificial Intelligence Center, and was its director from 1970 to 1973. While at SRI, he helped invent the A* search algorithm and develop Shakey the robot, which was one of the first projects sponsored by DARPA; Raphael directed work on Shakey from 1970 to 1971. He also co-founded the Journal of Artificial Intelligence.

In 1976 he sold the NLS technology developed by the Augmentation Research Center (ARC), led by Douglas Engelbart, to Tymshare.

From 1980 to 1990 Raphael worked as a research manager at Hewlett Packard. From 1990 to 1997 he helped his wife, Anne, operate Compass Point Travel Inc., a business that she had founded in 1980 in Mountain View, California.

He was a Senior Fulbright Lecturer in Vienna during 1973 and 1974.

Selected publications
Books
The Thinking Computer: Mind Inside Matter (W.H. Freeman & Company, 1976)

Dissertation
SIR (Semantic Information Retrieval program) on the logical representation of knowledge for question-answering systems (MIT, 1964)

See also
History of artificial intelligence

References

Artificial intelligence researchers
Living people
Rensselaer Polytechnic Institute alumni
Massachusetts Institute of Technology School of Science alumni
1936 births
SRI International people